Head On Photo Festival is an international annual photography festival based in Sydney, Australia, showing emerging and established photo-artists. It was founded in 2004 by Moshe Rosenzveig OAM with the first Head On Portrait Award. The Festival is held across multiple venues, including public and commercial galleries as well as public outdoor spaces. 

The Festival and its flagship exhibition, Head On Photo Awards, are run by the non-profit organisation, Head On Foundation (established 2008).

Details
All work submitted to the Festival and the Awards are judged without the artists' names attached, ensuring the work is selected on merit alone. 

The Festival is held in various venues across Sydney with the Festival hub based in Paddington. In 2020, Head On held six exhibitions along Bondi Beach in Sydney.

Head On Photo Festival has exhibited work by Australian and international photographers. In 2012, the Festival premiered the exhibition and book (Based On a True Story) by David Alan Harvey at the Australian Centre for Photography and exhibited Burn in Print at Bondi Pavilion with work by James Nachtwey, Davide Monteleone, Laura El Tantawy and others. In 2013, Head On collaborated with New York gallery, Yossi Milo Gallery to exhibit Doug Rickard and Tim Hetherington's work at Stills Gallery, Sydney. In 2013 Head On exhibited iAfgahnistan at the State Library of NSW by Benjamin Lowy who works with mobile phone, plastic camera and cutting edge DSLR. In 2014, 2016 and 2017 Head On Photo Festival included exhibitions of Christian Thompson AO at Michael Reid Gallery. In 2016 Head On exhibited Hendrik Kerstens and Erwin Olaf at Customs House with their exhibition Dutch Masters of Light and Roger Ballen's Theatre of the Mind at Sydney College of the Arts gallery. The 2016 Festival also premiered the exhibition The Lost Rolls by American photojournalist Ron Haviv and a show by German photographer, Sven Marquardt of Berlin's nightclub, Berghain. In 2017 the Festival premiered the exhibition Secret Garden of Lily La Palma by Maggie Steber at UNSW Art and Design. Another exhibition from Head On Photo Festival 2017, was Targets by German photographer Herlinde Koelbl at Paddington Reservoir Gardens.

Head On(line) Photo Festival 2020 

In 2020, Head On became the first photography festival in the world to be delivered entirely online due to the effects of the COVID-19 pandemic.

The online Festival featured a selection of free exhibitions, artist talks, panel discussions and webinars. A highlight of Head On(line) Photo Festival was Paper Tigers, an exhibition featuring 60 images from 60 of Australia's leading photojournalists.

The Festival was opened virtually by Osher Gunsberg. The Festival itself attracted 80,000 visits from 148 countries.

Head On Photo Awards 
The Head On Photo Awards represents photography across Portrait and Landscape categories. The Head On Student Award is open to Australian primary and secondary school students. In 2020, the total prize pool was valued at A$70,000, including two cash prizes of A$15,000 each. Since its inception in 2004, Head On Foundation distributed over A$700,000 in cash and products as prizes.

Head On Photo Awards included a prize for images produced on a mobile-device until 2019. Mobile photography is no longer its own category, but is incorporated into the other categories.

Winners 

2005: Samantha Everton, Anthony Browell, Stephen Dupont
2006: Greg Weight, Patricia Casey, Sally McInerney 
2007: Stephen Dupont, Thuy Vy, Matthew Duchesne, Neil Wallace 
2008: Brendan Esposito, Richard Kendall, Tobias Titz 
2009: Janyon Boschoff, Vincent Long, Gary Heery 
2010: Gil Meydan, Karl Schwerdtfeger, Fiona Wolf 
2011: Stephen Dupont, Shauna Greyerbiehl, Katrin Koenning
2012: Chris Budgeon, David Manley, Tracey Nearmy, Louise Whelan 
2013: Jonathan May, Brian Casey, Matthew Reed, Tim Levy 
2014: Joe Wigdahl (Portrait Award), Nick Hannes (Landscape Award), Andrew Quilty (Mobile Award) 
2015: Molly Harris (Portrait Award), Alfonso Perez de Velasco (Landscape Award), Laki Sideris (Mobile Award), Paul Philpott (Student Award) 
2016 : Antonio Heredia (Portrait Award), David Chancellor (Landscape Award), Ako Salemi (Mobile Award), Isabelle Sijan (Student Award)
2017: Cesar Dezfuli (Portrait Award), Todd Kennedy (Landscape Award), Demetris Koilalous (Mobile Award), Sophie Smith (Student Award) 
2018: Irmina Walczak & Sávio Freire (Portrait Award), Roger Grasas (Landscape Award), Zay Yar Lin (Mobile Award), Hi Yin Chan (Student Award)
2019: Juliet Taylor (Portrait Award), Bruce Haswell (Landscape Award), Mel Meek (Mobile Award), Aimee Sluga (Student Award)
2020: Fiona Wolf-Symeonides (Portrait Award), Marcia Macmillan (Landscape Award), Joel Parkinson (Student Award)
2021: Gideon Mendel (Portrait Award), Aletheia Casey (Landscape Award), Chege Mbuthi (Student Award)
2022: Marika Lortkipanidze (Portrait Award), Antoine Buttafoghi (Landscape Award), Leila Middleton (Student Award)

Collaborations and tours 

Head On has worked with many galleries, museums, festivals and arts organisations both in Australia and internationally. Head On Photo Festival presented the exhibition Spy/Spy, a cross look at the Cannes Film Festival, at Casula Powerhouse Arts Centre. In 2016 and 2017 the Head On Portrait Awards were exhibited at the Museum of Sydney.

In 2018 former curator of the National Gallery of Australia, Gael Newton and Paul Costigan curated an exhibition of Frank Hurley's life and work at the Manly Art Gallery and Museum.

Head On has also presented exhibitions in collaboration with the Australian National Maritime Museum, Sydney Film Festival, University of Technology, Royal Botanic Gardens, Stills Gallery, Yossi Milo Gallery (New York) and the State Library of NSW.

The Festival has toured internationally to the USA, China, India, Holland and New Zealand, featuring in international festivals such as; Photoville, Auckland Photo Festival, Indian Photography Festival, Ballarat International Foto Biennale, International Photo Festival Leiden, Vivid Sydney, Pingyao International Photography Festival and Photo Beijing. In 2020, Head On collaborated with the Royal College of Music, London, to create new musical works inspired by images from the Head On Photo Awards.

References

External links

Festivals in Sydney
Art festivals in Australia
Photography festivals
Recurring events established in 2004
2004 establishments in Australia